Loučim is a municipality and village in Domažlice District in the Plzeň Region of the Czech Republic. It has about 100 inhabitants.

References

Villages in Domažlice District